Sanapana (sanapana payvoma) is a language of the Paraguayan Chaco.

Sanapaná people call themselves nenlhet; Enxet people call Sanapaná people saapa'ang; Guaná people call them kasnapan; and Enlhet people, kelya'mok.

Phonology

Vowels 
Three vowels are noted as /e a o/.

Consonants

References

External links
Sanapaná (Angaité dialect) (Intercontinental Dictionary Series)
Sanapaná (Enlhet dialect) (Intercontinental Dictionary Series)

Languages of Paraguay
Mascoian languages
Articles citing ISO change requests
Chaco linguistic area